Junior Barros (born April 19, 1993) is a Brazilian football player who currently plays as a forward for Lao League 1 club Salavan Real Estage.

Career
Junior Barros joined J1 League club Ventforet Kofu in 2017.

Club statistics
Updated to end of 2018 season.

References

External links
Profile at Ventforet Kofu

1993 births
Living people
Brazilian footballers
Brazilian expatriate footballers
Campeonato Brasileiro Série B players
Campeonato Brasileiro Série D players
J1 League players
J2 League players
Club Athletico Paranaense players
Esporte Clube XV de Novembro (Piracicaba) players
Associação Desportiva Recreativa e Cultural Icasa players
Anápolis Futebol Clube players
Ventforet Kofu players
FC Gifu players
Association football forwards
Brazilian expatriate sportspeople in Japan
Expatriate footballers in Japan
Expatriate footballers in Cambodia
Brazilian expatriate sportspeople in Cambodia